Saxifragodes is a genus of flowering plants belonging to the family Saxifragaceae.

Its native range is Southern Chile to Southern Argentina.

Species
Species:
 Saxifragodes albowiana (Kurtz) D.M.Moore

References

Saxifragaceae
Saxifragaceae genera